Cyrus Kamron Rollocks (born 23 March 1998) is a Canadian professional soccer player who plays as a forward for League1 Ontario club Scrosoppi FC.

Club career
In 2015, Rollocks played for Toronto FC Academy in League1 Ontario, finishing fourth in league scoring with fourteen goals. In 2016, Rollocks scored four goals in ten appearances for TFCIII in L1O and also scored four goals in thirteen appearances in the Premier Development League. In 2017, Rollocks scored seventeen goals in seventeen appearances for Toronto FC III, tying for second in league scoring. He was subsequently named the 2017 League1 Ontario Young Player of the Year.

In 2018, Rollocks joined League1 Ontario side Master's Futbol, scoring three goals in six appearances that season.

On 17 January 2019, Rollocks signed with Canadian Premier League side York9 FC. On 27 April 2019, Rollocks made his professional debut for York 9 in the Canadian Premier League’s inaugural match, ending in a 1-1 draw with Forge FC. He made a total of nine appearances in league play and two in the Canadian Championship that year. On 15 November 2019, the club announced that Rollocks would not be returning for the 2020 season.

In March 2020, Rollocks went on trial with Forge FC.

In 2021, he joined Blue Devils FC of League1 Ontario, scoring two goals in his debut against North Mississauga SC.

In 2022, he played with Scrosoppi FC in League1 Ontario. On June 26, he was an emergency signing for his former club York United FC (previously known as York9 when he played for them), appearing in the match against Valour FC.

International career
Rollocks received his first Canadian youth national team call-up for an under-17 camp in December 2014. He subsequently represented Canada at the 2015 CONCACAF U-17 Championship, where he made substitute appearances against Mexico and Costa Rica.

Career statistics

References

External links

1998 births
Living people
Association football forwards
Canadian soccer players
Soccer players from Toronto
Black Canadian soccer players
Toronto FC players
Toronto FC II players
York United FC players
League1 Ontario players
Canadian Premier League players
Canada men's youth international soccer players
Master's FA players
North Mississauga SC players
Blue Devils FC players
Scrosoppi FC players